NGC 91 (PGC 3325956, GC 41, GC 5097, or NPD 68 22.9) is a star with an apparent magnitude of 14.4 in the constellation of Andromeda. The star is southwest of the galaxy NGC 90. Discovered in 1866 by Herman Schultz, there have been many arguments if this star exists or not. However, people have observed the star, and have confirmed that NGC 91 exists.

References

External links
 

Andromeda (constellation)
0091
18661017
3325956